Events in the year 2023 in Mali.

Incumbents 

 President: Assimi Goïta
 Prime Minister: Abdoulaye Maïga
 National Committee for the Salvation of the People:
 Chairman: Colonel Assimi Goïta
 Spokesman: Colonel-Major Ismaël Wagué

Events 
Ongoing — COVID-19 pandemic in Mali and Mali War

January to March 

 January 2 – Two firefighters and three civilians are killed in an armed attack by Islamist insurgents along a highway between Bamako and Ségou.
 January 6 – Interim president Assimi Goïta pardons 49 Ivorian soldiers who were arrested in July and convicted of "undermining state security".
 February 24 – Twelve people are killed after gunmen attack a village in central Mali.

See also 

African Continental Free Trade Area
COVID-19 pandemic in Africa
Organisation internationale de la Francophonie
Economic Community of West African States
Community of Sahel–Saharan States

References 

Mali
Years in Mali